The 2016–17 season is Hapoel Be'er Sheva 82nd season since its establishment in 1934, and 69th since the establishment of the State of Israel. During the 2016–17 campaign the club have competed in the Israeli Premier League, State Cup, Toto Cup,  UEFA Champions League.

Current squad

Transfers

Summer

In:

Out:

Pre-season and friendlies

Israeli Premier League

State Cup

Toto Cup Al

UEFA Champions League

Second qualifying round

Third qualifying round

Play-Off Round

UEFA Europa League

Group stage

Knockout Phase

Hapoel Be'er Sheva
Hapoel Be'er Sheva F.C. seasons
Hapoel Be'er Sheva